Focalisation is a term coined by the French narrative theorist Gérard Genette.  It refers to the perspective through which a narrative is presented. Genette focuses on the interplay between three forms of focalization and the distinction between heterodiegetic and homodiegetic narrators. Homodiegetic narrators exist in the same (hence the prefix 'homo') storyworld as the characters exist in, whereas heterodiegetic narrators are not a part of that storyworld. The term 'focalization' refers to how information is restricted in storytelling. Genette distinguishes between internal focalization, external focalization, and zero focalization. Internal focalization means that the narrative focuses on thoughts and emotions while external focalization focuses solely on characters' actions, behavior, the setting etc. Zero focalization is seen when the narrator is omniscient in the sense that it is not restricted.

Determinant
Focalization in literature is similar to point-of-view (POV) in film-making and point of view in literature, but professionals in the field often see these two traditions as being distinctly different. Genette's work was intended to refine the notions of point of view and narrative perspective. It separates the question of "Who sees?" in a narrative from "who speaks?"  A narrative where all information presented reflects the subjective perception of a certain character is said to be internally focalised.  An omniscient narrator corresponds to zero focalization. External focalisation is the camera eye.

A novel in which no simple rules restrict the transition between different focalizations could be said to be unfocalised, but specific relationships between basic types of focalization constitute more complex focalization strategies; for example, a novel could provide external focalization alternating with internal focalizations through three different characters, where the second character is never focalized except after the first, and three other characters are never focalized at all.

Narratology
The specific domain of literary theory which deals with focalisation is narratology, which concerns not only distinctions between subjective and objective focalisations but various gradations between them, such as free indirect speech or quasi-direct discourse.  Narratologists tend to have a difficult time agreeing on the exact definitions of categories in their field; hence its dynamic nature.

See also 
 Volosinov
 Gerard Genette
 Jonathan Culler
 Erich Auerbach

References

Terms in literary theory
Narratology